Östra Nyland (meaning "Eastern Nyland" in English) was a Swedish-language newspaper published in Loviisa in Finland.

History and profile
The newspaper was founded in 1881, and it was the world's easternmost Swedish-language newspaper. The paper was owned and published by KSF Media which also publishes Hufvudstadsbladet, Västra Nyland, Hangötidningen, Borgåbladet and Loviisan Sanomat. 

Östra Nyland was published three times a week and its headquarters were in Loviisa. The last editor of the paper was Camilla Berggren.

In 1995 Östra Nyland had a circulation of 4,377 copies. The circulation of the paper was 3,533 copies in 2012.

In January 2015, Östra Nyland and Borgåbladet were amalgamated into the new newspaper Östnyland.

References

External links
 Östra Nyland 
 KSF Media

1881 establishments in Finland
Publications established in 1881
Swedish-language newspapers published in Finland
Mass media in Loviisa
Publications disestablished in 2015
Defunct newspapers published in Finland
2015 disestablishments in Finland